Route 31 is a north–south state highway in Connecticut running for  from Route 74 in Vernon to Route 32 in Mansfield.  Although it is officially logged as an east-west route, it is signed north-south.

Route description

Route 31 begins at an intersection with Route 74 in Vernon and heads southeast, intersecting Route 30, and I-84 at exit 67 before crossing into Tolland.

In Tolland, Route 31 continues southeast before turning south briefly before crossing into Coventry.  In Coventry, Route 31 continues south to a concurrency with US 44.  The two highways run together for slightly more than one mile (1.6 km) before Route 31 heads southeast, crossing Route 275 before continuing into Mansfield.

In Mansfield, Route 31 continues southeast before ending at an intersection with Route 32.

History

The southern part of Route 31 was commissioned as part of the original alignment of US 6 in 1926.  In approximately 1938, US 6 was rerouted and the old route was designated US 6A.

In 1942, US 6 was rerouted again and the old US 6A was commissioned as Route 31.  In 1963, Route 31 was extended northward to its current route.

Junction list

References

External links

031
Transportation in Tolland County, Connecticut
Vernon, Connecticut
Coventry, Connecticut
Mansfield, Connecticut
U.S. Route 6
1942 establishments in Connecticut